Carol Emshwiller (April 12, 1921 – February 2, 2019) was an American writer of avant garde short stories and science fiction who has won prizes ranging from the Nebula Award to the Philip K. Dick Award. Ursula K. Le Guin has called her "a major fabulist, a marvelous magical realist, one of the strongest, most complex, most consistently feminist voices in fiction". Among her novels are Carmen Dog and The Mount. She has also written two cowboy novels called Ledoyt and Leaping Man Hill. Her last novel, The Secret City, was published in April 2007.

She was the widow of artist and experimental filmmaker Ed Emshwiller and "regularly served as his model for paintings of beautiful women." The couple had three children. Susan Jenny Coulson co-wrote the movie Pollock; 
Peter is an actor, artist, screenwriter, and novelist; and Eve is a botanist and ethnobotanist at the University of Wisconsin–Madison.

Biography
Emshwiller was born in Ann Arbor, Michigan. She lived in New York City most of the year and spent her summers in Owens Valley, California, and has used this setting in her stories.

In 2005, she was awarded the World Fantasy Award for Life Achievement. Her short story "Creature", won the 2002 Nebula Award for Best Short Story, and "I Live With You" won the 2005 Nebula Award in the same category.

In 2009, she donated her archive to the department of Rare Books and Special Collections at Northern Illinois University.

She died on February 2, 2019, in Durham, North Carolina, where she was living with her daughter, Susan Jenny Coulson.

Bibliography

Novels
 
Ledoyt (1995)
Leaping Man Hill (1999)
The Mount (2002)
Mister Boots (2005)
The Secret City (Tachyon Publications, 2007)

Short fiction
Collections
Joy in Our Cause: Short Stories (1974)
Verging on the Pertinent (1989)
The Start of the End of It All (1990) (Winner of the World Fantasy Award, Best Collection)
Report to the Men's Club and Other Stories (2002)
I Live With You (Tachyon Publications, 2005)
The Collected Stories of Carol Emshwiller (2011)
In The Time Of War & Master Of the Road To Nowhere (2011)
Stories

References

External links
 
 Biography at The Encyclopedia of Science Fiction

2011 radio interview at The Bat Segundo Show
 
 PELT (1958), reprint at Library of America. Includes a biographical sketch, and a 1957 portrait by Ed Emshwiller.
 Episode 6 of the podcast Buxom Blondes with Ray Guns (Hannah Wolfe, March 3, 2018) features two 1957 stories by Carol Emshwiller.

1921 births
2019 deaths
20th-century American novelists
20th-century American short story writers
20th-century American women writers
21st-century American novelists
21st-century American short story writers
21st-century American women writers
American fantasy writers
American feminist writers
American science fiction writers
American women novelists
American women short story writers
Fabulists
The Magazine of Fantasy & Science Fiction people
Nebula Award winners
Novelists from Michigan
University of Michigan alumni
Women science fiction and fantasy writers
World Fantasy Award-winning writers
Writers from Ann Arbor, Michigan